Dorcus brevis is a species of stag beetle that can be found in the Eastern United States.

References 

Lucaninae
Beetles of the United States
Beetles described in 1825
Taxa named by Thomas Say